A referendum on integration with the United Kingdom was held in Malta on 11 and 12 February 1956. The proposals were approved by 77% of those who voted, on a turnout of 59.1%. They were never fully implemented, and the country became a Realm within the British Commonwealth titled the State of Malta eight years later.

Proposals

Under the proposals, Malta would have had three seats of its own in the British House of Commons. In addition, the Home Office would take over responsibility for Maltese affairs from the Colonial Office. The UK parliament would have control of defence and foreign affairs, and eventually direct taxation, whereas the Maltese parliament would be responsible for all other areas of public life, including education and the position of the Catholic Church. Standards of living on the islands would be raised to parity with the rest of the UK by raising wages and increasing employment opportunities.

Results

References

Referendums in Malta
Malta
1956 in Malta
Malta and the Commonwealth of Nations
Malta–United Kingdom relations
United Kingdom and the Commonwealth of Nations
Crown Colony of Malta
February 1956 events in Europe